The Latino vote or refers to the voting trends during elections in the United States by eligible voters of Latino background. This phrase is usually mentioned by the media as a way to label voters of this ethnicity, and to opine that this demographic group could potentially tilt the outcome of an election, and how candidates have developed messaging strategies to this ethnic group.

Voting demographics
Per the Pew Research Center, the top states with the highest percentage of eligible Latino voters in 2020 were: New Mexico (42.8%), California (30.5%), Texas (30.4%), Arizona (23.6%), Florida (20.5%), Nevada (19.7%), Colorado (15.9%), New Jersey (15.3%), New York (14.8%), Connecticut (12.3%), Illinois (11.6%), and Rhode Island (11.3%).

Low voting turnout

In 2006, the percentage of Latinos who participate in political activities varies, but rarely exceeds half of those eligible.  In general, Latinos participate in common civic activities, such as voting, at much lower rates than nearby non-Latino whites or blacks. Approximately 57.9 percent of U.S. citizen adult Latinos were registered to vote at the time of the 2004 election, and 47.2 percent turned out to vote. The voter registration and turnout rates are approximately 10 percent lower than those of non-Latino blacks and 18 percent lower than those of non-Latino whites.

To explain low voter turnout among Latinos, researchers have analyzed voter participation demographics throughout many years. Per a 2002 study, researchers have found many explanations as towards why Latinos have a low voter turnout. There are explanations that account for physical barriers such as lack of transportation. As well as systemic barriers such as, harassment, discrimination, inadequate numbers of polling booths, inconvenient placements of polling booths, and biased administration of election laws may suppress Latino access to registering and voting.

One of the biggest explanation for low Latino voter turn outs is associated with accurately measuring the Latino vote based on a general population that includes many non-citizens. The number of adult non-U.S. citizens rose from 1.9 million in 1976 to more than 8.4 million in 2000, a 350 percent increase. Thus, the share of Latino nonparticipants are overwhelmingly non-U.S. citizens.

Another explanation for low levels of Latino voter turnout stems from the relatively young age of the Latino population. For example, 40 percent of the California Latino population was under eighteen years of age in 1985.

Individuals with lower incomes vote at lower rates than people with higher incomes. In terms of income, the general argument is that individuals with higher socioeconomic status have the civic skills, the participatory attitudes, and the time and money to facilitate participation. Education is also positively related to participation and vote choice, as Latinos with a college degree and postgraduate training are more likely to vote. More than 30 percent of Latino adult citizens have less than a high school education, while 12 percent of non-Latino white adult citizens have less than a high school education. Therefore, low participation may result from low levels of knowledge about the political process that should be garnered through formal education.

This does vary based on country of origin. A 2003 study discussed how female Mexican-Americans and those attaining higher levels of income were more likely to register, and in turn, participate in voting. The same study concluded that education and marital status posed the primary barriers to Puerto Rican voter registration. These sorts of variations in factors seem to be present across many Latino communities in the United States. Additionally, studies have shown that the presence of Latino/a candidates on the ballot tends to yield a higher voter turnout among these communities. This is in part due to the strong association between cultural identification and partisanship. The ever-growing presence of Latino/a voters in politics is representative of the group's growing presence across the United States, making up over 30% of the population in swing or politically significant states such as Texas, Arizona, or California.It's also worth noting that large migrating populations, such as the increase of Cuban-Americans in Florida, have a strong impact for similar reasons. Community identification proves a strong factor in voter registration, particularly among working Latinas. Puerto Ricans in Southern states have similar turnout rates, presumably for similar reasons; that said, there does exist quite a bit of variation in numbers across states, in part due to the aforementioned factors.

Among other minority communities in the US, turnout seems to be increased by the presence of a member of their race on the ballot, black voter turnout rose significantly with Obama's two presidential campaigns and then fell back again in 2016.

Although turn out for Latinos is low, it has been noted that Latinos residing in communities with a large Latino population are more likely to turn out to vote.

Latino vote influences
There is a significant amount of literature dedicated to analyzing what influences Latino vote choices. One strong determinant has been found to be religion, which is believed to play a role in defining the political attitudes and behaviors of Latino voters. Latinos have long been associated with Catholicism with respect to faith and religious identity and with the Democratic Party with regard to political allegiance and identity. Although most Latinos affiliate themselves with the Democratic Party, the Latino National Political Survey, has found a consistent finding that Latinos identify themselves ideologically as moderates and conservatives. Social conservatism usually originates from religion, which oftentimes predicts Latino's opposition to abortion, same-sex marriage, support for the death penalty, and support for traditional gender roles. Religion's ideological role is undeniable in its political influence in both parties. However, noting the shared collective identity that is often associated with a particular religion, it's worth noting that political beliefs are often a result of community values, rather than solely religious. Notably, in 2006 and 2008, the Democratic party held an advantage in Latino/a voter turnout and results. During these election cycles, and still to a degree today, the Democratic party appeals to issues such as immigration and healthcare, while the Republican party tends to continue on social issues and religion-based appeal.

Although the Latina vote, in particular, is sometimes seen as a product of social movements in many media outlets, some scholars in the social sciences argue that it is a movement in and of itself born out of historical left-wing advocacy. For example, LLEGÓ, the National Latina/o Lesbian, Gay, Bisexual, and Transgender Organization (1987-present) remains a leader in Latina activism in the United States. Organizations such as LLEGÓ have had historical impact over the political ideologies of its members, and has greatly influenced political participation over the years within these often overlooked communities. Considering the aforementioned important role played by ethnic and religious identity, these organizations cultivate a sense of collective political pride. In turn, voting turnout is often seen to increase with regards to historical and current members of LLEGÓ and other groups.

Political ads have also been studied to determine how they influence Latino voting behavior. In a study conducted by Abrajano, it was concluded that different political ads influence Latino vote choices depending on how assimilated individuals are to American life. For Spanish dominated Latinos, political ads that tapped into ethnic identity seemed to be the most influential. On the other hand, for assimilated Latinos, ethnic appeals did have some influence but exposure to more informative policy ads in English or Spanish had a greater impact on these voters' decision to vote. During political movements in the 1960s and 1970s such as the women's liberation movement and the Chicano movement, Latina females began to unite around ideals similar to those embraced by feminist voter organizations including the Third World Women's Alliance and other Bay Area activist groups. According to a study performed using the November 2000 CPS, education appeared to hold the greatest influence over Latina voter registration and choice, among income, employment, and homeowner status. However, this study was conducted across the United States. Keeping this in mind, it is important to reconcile the issues important to singular communities with these overarching themes. For example, considering the growing Latino/a populations in Florida from Puerto Rico, factors of registration and choice will differ greatly between these groups and Latinos/as in other parts of the state.

Policies
In the United States, the Latino vote is typically associated with immigration issues such as immigration reform, immigration enforcement and amnesty for undocumented immigrants, usually with images of Mexican illegal immigrants crossing the border or being arrested by the border patrol, despite the fact that in many cases immigration could be an issue no more important than unemployment or the economy for many Latino American citizens.

Data from both the 2002 and 1999 National Surveys on Latinos revealed that over 60% percent of Latinos favor a larger government with more government programs, even if this means higher taxes. A 1992 study indicated that government programs that Latinos are more likely to advocate for are those that focus on issues such as crime control and drug prevention, child care services, environmental protection, science and technology, defense, and programs for refugees and immigrants

According to the National Exit Poll, in 2012 60% of Latino voters identified the economy as the most important issue the country was facing. Education is also a constant preoccupation among Latino voters. Latinos emphasize education, mentioning such issues as expanding the number of schools, reducing class sizes, and adding to the cultural sensitivity of teachers and curricula. Other educational concerns expressed by Latinos include ensuring that children are able to advance to the next educational level. Following the economy and education, health care (18%), the federal budget deficit (11%) and foreign policy (6%), were other concerns among the Latino population.

2020 election 
Latino voters were a crucial part of President Joe Biden's electoral victory in the 2020 Presidential election. He won 65% of the Latino vote to Donald Trump's 32%, according to Edison Research exit polls. In the swing states of Arizona and Nevada, Latino voters made the difference for Joe Biden. Many Latino voters in Nevada are members of the Culinary Union Local 226 and supported Biden based on Right-to-work standards. 

In heavily urbanized northeastern states and in California, Biden secured overwhelming majorities among Latino voters, as has long been the case for Democratic presidential candidates.

However, Latino voters proved that they were not monolithic. In Florida, Trump earned strong Latino support among Cuban and South American communities in Miami-Dade County, and earned 46% of the overall Latino vote in Florida, much higher than his 35% showing in 2016. This shift occurred due to anti-Socialist messaging by Trump's campaign. Still, it’s important to note that in every county outside of Miami-Dade County Latinos opted to vote for Biden by a 2 to 1 margin, and in the end he won the majority of Florida’s Latino electorate. 

Additionally, in heavily-Latino South Texas, Biden lost ground compared to Hillary Clinton in 2016, especially in rural counties, however he still carried the Latino vote in the Rio Grande Valley by double digits and two-thirds statewide.

See also

Hispanic and Latino Americans in politics
Hispanic and Latino conservatism in the United States
Politics of the United States
Race in the United States
United States presidential election
Jewish views and involvement in US politics
Catholic Church and politics in the United States
Identity politics

References

Further reading
 Barreto, Matt A., and Loren Collingwood. "Group-based appeals and the Latino vote in 2012: How immigration became a mobilizing issue." Electoral Studies 40 (2015): 490–499. Online
 Bell, Aaron. "The Role of the Latino Vote in the 2016 Elections." (2016). Online
 Coffin, Malcolm. "The Latino Vote: Shaping Americas Electoral Future". Political Quarterly.  74#2 (2003):  214–222. doi:10.1111/1467-923x.00531
 Collingwood, Loren, Matt A. Barreto, and Sergio I. Garcia-Rios. "Revisiting Latino voting: Cross-racial mobilization in the 2012 election." Political Research Quarterly  67.3 (2014): 632–645. online
 Francis-Fallon, Benjamin. The Rise of the Latino Vote: A History (Harvard  UP, 2019).
 Leal, David L., et al. "The Latino vote in the 2004 election." PS: Political Science & Politics 38.1 (2005): 41–49. online
 Lopez, Mark Hugo, and Ana Gonzalez-Barrera. "Inside the 2012 Latino electorate." ( Pew 2013) online.
 Nicholson, Stephen P., Adrian Pantoja, and Gary M. Segura. "Political knowledge and issue voting among the Latino electorate." Political Research Quarterly 59.2 (2006): 259–271. Online
 Nuño, Stephen A. "Latino mobilization and vote choice in the 2000 presidential election." American Politics Research 35.2 (2007): 273–293. Online
 Reny, Tyler, Bryan Wilcox-Archuleta, and Vanessa Cruz Nichols. "Threat, Mobilization, and Latino Voting in the 2018 Election." The Forum 16#4  (2018)  online
 Sanchez, Gabriel R., and Barbara Gomez-Aguinaga. "Latino Rejection of the Trump Campaign." Aztlán: A Journal of Chicano Studies 42.2 (2017).  Online
 Sears, David O., Felix Danbold, and Vanessa M. Zavala. "Incorporation of Latino immigrants into the American party system." RSF: The Russell Sage Foundation Journal of the Social Sciences 2 #3 (2016): 183–204. Online

Cultural politics
Hispanic and Latino American
Politics of the United States
Political terminology of the United States
Voting in the United States
Politics and race in the United States